Fife College is a further and higher education college in Fife, Scotland.

Campuses

The college's main campuses are located in Dunfermline, Glenrothes and Kirkcaldy with smaller campuses in Leven, and Rosyth. The college also operates community learning centres across Fife.

History
Fife College was created on 1 August 2013 as a merger of Adam Smith College, Carnegie College and non land based elements of the Elmwood Campus of the rural college SRUC. When the merger was announced in March of that year the new principal was named as Hugh Logan, formerly principal of Motherwell College.  Following the retirement of Hugh Logan, Hugh Hall was appointed as principal, taking office on 1 March 2017.

In March 2016, the college announced that it had secured the option to purchase land at former Hyundai site in Dunfermline. The college plans to build a new campus on the Shepherd Offshore site, which is expected to cost up to £100million, with the new campus due to be open by the summer of 2024.

Courses
The College delivers over 400 courses from introductory level to degree and post graduate studies. Courses are divided across 40 different subject areas, including:
 
 Administration and Office Technologies
 Art,| Design, Fashion and Jewellery
 Built Environment
 Business and Management
 Childcare
 Computing, Cyber and Digital Technologies
 Creative Media
 Culinary Arts
 Engineering and Energy
 English for Speakers of Other Languages
 Hair, Beauty and Makeup Artistry
 Health and Social Care
 Legal Services and Police Studies
 Performing Arts and Technical Theatre
 Science and Mathematics
 Sport and Fitness
 Tourism, Events and Customer Service

Andrew Carnegie Business School
The Andrew Carnegie Business School at Fife College provides business, leadership and management training from certificate to postgraduate level and also a range of CPD qualifications.

Adam Smith Scholarships
Adam Smith Scholarships is part of Fife College and was created to support students to develop opportunities, open doors and transform lives. It does this by awarding scholarships and has presented over 1800 scholarships to Fife College students worth almost £778,000 since it was created just over 20 years ago.

Through partnerships with businesses, charitable trusts and individual donors the Scholarship programme provides recognition, a financial award, and in some cases, work experience, internships and trips to support and encourage students to achieve their full potential.

Fife College Students' Association (FCSA)
FCSA is an autonomous, student-led, campaigning organisation, which provides services, representation and welfare support on behalf of students.
 
The day-to-day operation of The Association is fulfilled by the sabbatical officers, students who have finished college and work full-time for The Association.

Boom Radio
Boom Radio is Fife College's student radio station. Its studios are also used to train students on broadcast media courses. Boom Radio was relaunched in December 2021 following refurbishment of its studios. It is controlled from the campus in Glenrothes.

References

2013 establishments in Scotland
Education in Fife
Educational institutions established in 2013
Further education colleges in Scotland